"Helen Butte" vs. Madonna Pussy Badsmell is a studio album by To Live and Shave in L.A., released on August 6, 1996 by Full Contact Records.

Release and reception 

Aiding & Abetting called "Helen Butte" vs. Madonna Pussy Badsmell "a nice collection of random musical violence. To Live and Shave in L.A. already has a fine reputation for this sort of musical mayhem, and this album doesn't disappoint." AllMusic gave the album two out of five stars, calling it a "disturbing cacophony melted on in several, short pieces" and a "predictable gimmick that wears thin early."  Jeff Bagato of the Washington City Paper enjoyed and said "musically, Moog, bass, guitar, and lots of tape manipulation (heavy-metal records are particularly in evidence) are sucked into the black hole of Tom Smith's mixing board and condensed into piles of slurred, guttural ranting, static, and broken rock."

Track listing

Personnel 
Adapted from the "Helen Butte" vs. Madonna Pussy Badsmell liner notes.

To Live and Shave in L.A.
 Frank Falestra (as Rat Bastard) – bass guitar
 Tom Smith – lead vocals, tape, electronics, engineering, recording, mixing
 Ben Wolcott – electronics

Production and design
 Greg Chapman – liner notes
 Zalman Fishman – executive-production
 Priscilla Forthman – photography
 Sam Patton – photography
 Syd – design
 Angela Terrell – photography

Release history

References

External links 
 "Helen Butte" vs. Madonna Pussy Badsmell at Discogs (list of releases)
 "Helen Butte" vs. Madonna Pussy Badsmell at Bandcamp

1996 albums
To Live and Shave in L.A. albums
Fifth Colvmn Records albums